This list of New Zealand female boxing champions is a table showing the female boxers who have won the New Zealand professional championship. The title has been administered by the New Zealand Boxing Association, New Zealand National Boxing Federation, Professional Boxing Commission New Zealand and New Zealand Professional Boxing Association since 2002. A champion will often voluntarily relinquish the title in order to fight for a higher-ranked championship, such as the world. Where the date on which a champion relinquished the title is unclear.

History
In 2002, Sue Glassey became the first female to win a professional New Zealand national boxing title, winning against Wena Karaka. In 2008, Daniella Smith became the first female to win multiple professional New Zealand national boxing titles, winning her second title against Lisa Mauala. Daniella Smith is also the first female boxer to win a professional New Zealand national boxing title in multiple divisions, winning the title in both Super Welterweight and Welterweight division. In 2017, Geovana Peres became the first lgbt boxer to win a professional New Zealand national boxing title. Geovana is also the first ever boxer to win two professional New Zealand national boxing titles from different commissioning bodies including the New Zealand National Boxing Federation and Professional Boxing Commission New Zealand national titles. In 2018, Lani Daniels became the first female boxer to win two New Zealand national titles from two different weight divisions and two different commissioning bodies. On 12th of February, Mea Motu beat the 14 year record that was set by Daniella Smith for holding most New Zealand National titles in the women's division. She held the NZPBA Lightweight, PBCNZ Super Lightweight and PBCNZ Featherweight title. Motu went on to win titles in four different weight divisions.

Heavyweight

Light Heavyweight

Super Middleweight

Super Welterweight

Welterweight

Super Lightweight

Lightweight

Super Featherweight

Featherweight

Super Flyweight

See also

List of Australian female boxing champions
List of New Zealand heavyweight boxing champions
List of New Zealand cruiserweight boxing champions
List of New Zealand light heavyweight boxing champions
List of New Zealand super middleweight boxing champions
List of New Zealand middleweight boxing champions
List of New Zealand super welterweight boxing champions
List of New Zealand welterweight boxing champions
List of New Zealand super lightweight boxing champions
List of New Zealand lightweight boxing champions
List of New Zealand super featherweight boxing champions
List of New Zealand featherweight boxing champions
List of New Zealand bantamweight boxing champions
Professional boxing in New Zealand

References

External links
Boxrec
Boxing NZ History

Female
New
 
Boxing